Cyclists in Hong Kong have the same rights and responsibilities as all other road users, except for prohibitions from expressways and some other designated locations, such as tunnels and many bridges. At least one hand must be kept on the handlebars at all times. Cyclists must use a cycleway wherever one is present.

According to government statistics, 55% of the Hong Kong population is able to ride a bicycle.

Cycle tracks 
Cycle tracks in Hong Kong are located predominantly in the New Territories, in new towns.

The popular Tolo Harbour Cycle Path will become part of the planned New Territories Cycle Track Network, currently under development by the Civil Engineering and Development Department and originally due for completion in 2012-2015.

Mountain biking 
The mountain bike trails approved by the Agriculture, Fisheries and Conservation Department, are:
Sai Kung West Country Park (Wan Tsai Extension)   
Sai Kung West Country Park (Footpath between Hoi Ha Village and Wan Tsai Peninsula)   
Tai Lam Country Park (Tai Lam Mountain Bike Trail)   
Shek O Country Park (Hong Kong Trail from -Tai Tam Gap -to To Tei Wan)   
Lantau South Country Park (Catchwater road from Pui O to Kau Ling Chung)   
Lantau South Country Park (Chi Ma Wan Country Trail )   
Lantau South Country Park (Footpath on Chi Ma Wan Peninsula)   
Lantau South Country Park (Coastal trail from Mui Wo to Pui O)   
Sai Kung West Country Park (Pak Tam to Pak Sha O)   
Clear Water Bay Country Park (Ng Fai Tin to Ha Shan Tuk)

(High Junk Peak Mountain Bike Trail is not open on Sundays or public holidays)

See also
 Hong Kong Cycling Alliance
 Hong Kong Cycling Association

References

 
Hong Kong
Mountain biking venues